Loyola High School, Karimnagar, is a private Catholic secondary school located in Karimnagar, in the state of Telangana, India. The school was opened by the Society of Jesus in 1980 as a Telugu-medium school and also includes English-medium classes. It is currently a part of the Jesuits' educational complex on Rekurthi Road.

See also

 List of Jesuit schools
 List of schools in Telangana

References  

Jesuit secondary schools in India
Christian schools in Telangana
High schools and secondary schools in Telangana
Karimnagar district
Educational institutions established in 1980
1980 establishments in Andhra Pradesh